Christopher David Matheson (born December 11, 1959) is an American film director and screenwriter. Matheson is best known for his collaborations with fellow screenwriter Ed Solomon, together creating the Bill & Ted franchise, writing the three films Bill & Ted's Excellent Adventure, Bill & Ted's Bogus Journey, and Bill & Ted Face the Music. Together they also wrote the films Mom and Dad Save the World and Imagine That.

His 2015 book The Story of God: A Biblical Comedy about Love (and Hate) is an alternative interpretation of the Christian Bible as seen through the eyes of an atheist.

He is the son of author Richard Matheson, as well as the younger brother of fellow screenwriter Richard Christian Matheson and the brother of Ali Marie Matheson.

He is a graduate of University of California, Los Angeles.

Filmography

References

External links

1960 births
20th-century American screenwriters
21st-century American screenwriters
American male screenwriters
Living people
UCLA Film School alumni
People from Beverly Hills, California
Film directors from California
Screenwriters from California
20th-century American male writers
21st-century American male writers